The listed buildings in Bradford are arranged by civil parishes and wards as follows:

Listed buildings in Bradford (Bolton and Undercliffe Ward)
Listed buildings in Bradford (Bowling and Barkerend Ward)
Listed buildings in Bradford (Bradford Moor Ward)
Listed buildings in Bradford (City Ward)
Listed buildings in Bradford (Eccleshill Ward)
Listed buildings in Bradford (Great Horton Ward)
Listed buildings in Bradford (Heaton Ward)
Listed buildings in Bradford (Little Horton Ward)
Listed buildings in Bradford (Manningham Ward)
Listed buildings in Bradford (Royds Ward)
Listed buildings in Bradford (Toller Ward)
Listed buildings in Bradford (Tong Ward)
Listed buildings in Bradford (Trident Parish)
Listed buildings in Bradford (Wibsey Ward)

Lists of listed buildings in Yorkshire